The National Technological University (UTN) is a country-wide national university in Argentina, and considered to be among the top engineering schools in the country. Hosting over 85,000 students, its student body is comparable to Argentina's third-largest university (the National University of La Plata) and exceeded significantly only by the University of Buenos Aires (UBA) (over 300,000 students). It has 29 semi-independent branches of various sizes located all over the country.

The engineering programs taught at most of those locations are:
Aeronautical Engineering
Chemical Engineering
Civil Engineering
Electrical Engineering (program heavily focused on Power Systems Engineering)
Electronic Engineering (program oriented towards electronics and telecommunications engineering)
Industrial Engineering
Information Systems Engineering
Mechanical Engineering

It is the only national university in the country with a focus on engineering. Many of the available programs have an intermediate diploma as well, typically after completing up to the 3rd or 4th year (generally Analyst's and Technician's degrees). The university also offers a broad range of degrees at tertiary and postgraduate level, including those of specialist, master and doctorate (PhD) in Engineering.

Due to its strongly federalized approach, it is the only university with campuses across the country, graduating almost 50% of the new engineers in Argentina.

Research and Development is conducted in 18 official centers. Some of the areas these centers specialize in are: Chemical Engineering, Information Technology, Energy research, Environmental Science, Robotics, Mechanics, and Construction Engineering.

Enrollment
As it is for most universities in Argentina, the only enrollment requirements are a secondary education degree and passing the university's entrance exam. Because of the low acceptance rate, it is common for applicants to take preparation courses given by either specialized private institutions, or by the university itself. Enrolling into the university's preparation courses given by the university itself does not require a minimum GPA. It only does so if the aspirant desires to take said preparation course before year's end, otherwise applicants are able to enroll in February courses freely, provided they have a valid high school diploma.

The students must declare the specialization of engineering they want to study at the moment of enrolling. If they wish to change it after their studies had begun, they have to take lectures in the specialized subjects. Only the foundational subjects are equivalent between degrees.

Engineer's Degree

After completing a five to six years program (or typically after passing 45 final exams in a longer time period) students earn an Engineer's degree (Eng.), or  Título de Ingeniero (Ing.) in Spanish. This is a professional degree with legal backing, enabling its graduates to perform any work in their chosen fields. All the programs include the same engineering foundational courses in Calculus, Physics, Algebra, Analytical Geometry, Probability, Statistics, Chemistry, Technical Drawing, Engineering in Society, Economics and Law.

Because of the length, breath, rigid structure and declaration of intent when enrolling, the degrees are not equivalent to a Bachelor's degree. But the objectives and professional orientation of the courses are similar to the Master of Engineering and it enables graduates to apply for a PhD in Engineering or related disciplines.

Some programs give students the option of getting an Intermediate Engineering Degree (IED) in their chosen fields after finishing the third or fourth year and completing an approved final project. The exact name of the IED varies depending on the field, for example the IED for the Chemical Engineer program is called University Chemical Technician, while the IED for Information Systems Engineer is University Systems Analyst.

Curricular Modernization
 
The curriculum has been going through a modernization process focused on analytic programs ("adecuación curricular"), and some careers have passed through a certification process ordered by the government agency CONEAU (Comisión Nacional de Evaluación y Acreditación Universitaria). The stated goal of this process is to start adapting the current model in accordance with the Bologna process.

History
The National Technological University (Universidad Tecnológica Nacional, UTN) was established as the National Workers' University (Universidad Obrera Nacional) by Law 13229, signed by President Juan Perón on August 19, 1948. It was created to cover the lack of technical specialists in the country at that time. The degree granted was that of Factory Engineer in many specialties.

The university evolved rapidly. The necessity of professionals with a deeper knowledge was accomplished by big academic and organizational changes. By 1954 the University had 9 branches in Buenos Aires, Córdoba, Mendoza, Rosario, Santa Fe, Bahía Blanca, La Plata, Tucumán and Avellaneda.

On October 14, 1959, the university was renamed as the National Technological University by law 14855. This marked the official beginning of the university as it is today.

Since then, more than 30,000 degrees in engineering have been granted. Today, the university maintains a strong network of international cooperation, and over 75 overseas institutions have signed cooperation agreements with the UTN.

Branches

Avellaneda Regional Faculty (FRA) Official website
Bahía Blanca Regional Faculty (FRBB) Official website
Buenos Aires Regional Faculty (FRBA) Official website
Chubut Regional Faculty
Concepción del Uruguay Regional Faculty (FRCU) Official website
Concordia Regional Faculty
Córdoba Regional Faculty (FRC) Official website
Delta Regional Faculty (FRD) Official website
General Pacheco Regional Faculty (FRGP) Official website
Haedo Regional Faculty (FRH) Official website
La Plata Regional Faculty (FRLP) Official website
La Rioja Regional Faculty
Mendoza Regional Faculty (FRM) Official website
Neuquén Regional Faculty
Paraná Regional Faculty (FRP) Official website
Rafaela Regional Faculty
Reconquista Regional Faculty
Resistencia Regional Faculty (FRRE) Official website
Río Grande Regional Faculty
Rosario Regional Faculty (FRRO) Official website
San Francisco Regional Faculty
San Nicolás Regional Faculty
San Rafael Regional Faculty
Santa Cruz Regional Faculty
Santa Fe Regional Faculty (FRSF) Official website
Trenque Lauquen Regional Faculty
Tucumán Regional Faculty (FRT) Official website
Venado Tuerto Regional Faculty
Villa María Regional Faculty
National Higher Institute of the Technician Professorate - associated with UNT (INSPT) Official website

Sports
The university has a competitive basketball team where some notable players such as Ernesto Oglivie, national team player for Panama, started their careers.

See also
List of universities in Argentina

References

External links

 
Science and Education in Argentina
Argentine Higher Education Official Site

 
1948 establishments in Argentina
Argentine national universities
Educational institutions established in 1948
Technical universities and colleges in Argentina
Engineering universities and colleges in Argentina